Lincolnshire Gate is the name given to a corner in the road between Holywell, Lincolnshire and Pickworth, Rutland to the south-west of Castle Bytham, in Lincolnshire, England. It describes a point where this small country road crosses the county border between Lincolnshire and Rutland, to pass between Newell Wood and Howitts Gorse. On either side are the remains of small quarries, worked from the Middle Ages till the early 20th century for building and road stone for nearby use.

There are no human settlements at Lincolnshire Gate.

References 

Nature reserves in Lincolnshire
Road junctions in England
Sites of Special Scientific Interest in Lincolnshire
South Kesteven District
Special Protection Areas in England